Bare Knuckle Fighting Championship UK. In September 2022 it was announced that Bare Knuckle Fighting Championship had formed Bare Knuckle Fighting Championship UK (BKFC UK) by acquiring the existing UK based Bare Fist Boxing Association (BFBA).

The Ring 

BKFC UK holds all bouts in a circular four-rope ring, referred to as the "Squared Circle". This ring incorporates elements of historical bare knuckle fighting by containing two scratch lines, three feet apart and in the middle of the ring. These scratch lines are based on the Broughton Rules, which governed bare knuckle fighting in the 19th century. It is a requirement that each fighter must start each round with their front foot on their scratch line. This is referred to as "Toe the Line", and it is an instruction given to the fighters at the beginning of each round, followed by "Knuckle Up" which signals the beginning of the round. This ring is unique within bare knuckle boxing and in part contributes to the sports appeal.

History
BKFC UK's first event was announced as taking place on 26 November 2022 in Newcastle upon Tyne with the headline bout being a BKFC Heavyweight Title Elimination Bout contested by Mick Terrill of Newcastle and Steve ‘Panda’ Banks of America via Thailand. Other notable bouts included Darren Hendry v Anthony Holmes and Danny Christie v Darren Godfrey Jr. The UK's first female Muslim fighter Melanie Shah of Birmingham UK made her bare knuckle debut taking on Mathilda Wilson of Sweden, Shah emerged victorious taking a split decision win. Melanie Shah is also the first British female to fight for BKFC.

Events

BKFC UK 1

BKFC 1 Was held on the 26th November 2022 at The Walker Activity Dome in Newcastle-upon-Tyne.  A capacity crowd of 1,700 were in attendance to watch a 10-bout fight card with the first 3 bouts being broadcast live on YouTube with the remaining maincard bouts being broadcast live via the BKFC App. The Main Event saw local fighter Mick Terrill take on Steve 'Panda' Banks in a BKFC Heavyweight title eliminator with Terrill emerging victorious after Banks was ruled unfit to continue by the ringside doctor due to heavy cuts around his eyes. The co-main event saw Darren Hendry meet Anthony Holmes to challenge for the inaugural BKFC UK Cruiserweight title, with Anthony Holmes securing victory in round 4 by way of KO after landing a heavy blow to the nose of Darren Hendry. The event also saw the debut of the UK's first female Muslim fighter Melanie Shah who emerged victorious with a split decision win over Mathilda Wilson of Sweden.

BKFC UK 2 - BKFC 37 

BKFC UK's second event is scheduled for 4th March 2023 and will be held at the Crystal Palace National Sports Centre, London. In a departure from the inaugural BKFC UK event, the second event is to be a numbered BKFC event - BKFC 37 - with the main event a BKFC Welterweight Title eliminator bout to be contested between Connor Tierney and Jake Lindsey.

List of Current Champions

Bare Knuckle Fighting Championship UK (BKFC UK)

See also
 Bare Knuckle Fighting Championship
 Bare Knuckle Boxing Hall of Fame
 BYB Extreme
 Chivarreto boxing
 Lethwei
 List of bare-knuckle lightweight champions
 London Prize Ring rules
 Russian boxing

References

Bare Knuckle Fighting Championship